Deodhar is an Indian surname typically found in the western state of Maharashtra. Notable people with this surname include:

B. R. Deodhar, Indian singer, musicologist, and music educator
D. B. Deodhar, cricketer
Vinay V. Deodhar (died 2015), Indian mathematician
Sayali Deodhar, Marathi Actress

Indian surnames